William Charles Earnshaw  is Professor of Chromosome Dynamics at the University of Edinburgh where he has been a Wellcome Trust Principal Research Fellow since 1996.

Education
Earnshaw was educated at Lenox School for Boys, Colby College and Massachusetts Institute of Technology (MIT) where he was awarded a PhD in 1977 for research on Enterobacteria phage P22 supervised by Jonathan King.

Career and research
Earnshaw completed postdoctoral research at the University of Cambridge with Aaron Klug and Ron Laskey and at the University of Geneva with Ulrich Laemmli. Following this, he moved to the Johns Hopkins School of Medicine, working in Tom Pollard's department of cell biology for 13 years. His former doctoral students include Jan Bergmann, Anca Petruti-Mot, Susana Ribeiro, Laura Wood, Zhenjie Xu, and Nikolaj Zuleger.

Awards and honours
Earnshaw was elected a Fellow of the Royal Society (FRS) in 2013. His certificate of election reads: 

Earnshaw is also an elected Fellow of the Royal Society of Edinburgh (FRSE), the Academy of Medical Sciences (FMedSci) and a member of the  European Molecular Biology Organization (EMBO).

References

Living people
Wellcome Trust Principal Research Fellows
Fellows of the Royal Society
Fellows of the Academy of Medical Sciences (United Kingdom)
Fellows of the Royal Society of Edinburgh
Members of the European Molecular Biology Organization
Year of birth missing (living people)